United Nations Security Council resolution 1638, adopted unanimously on 11 November 2005, after recalling all previous resolutions on the situation in Liberia, Sierra Leone and West Africa, the Council included the apprehension, detention and transfer to the Special Court for Sierra Leone of former Liberian President Charles Taylor in the mandate of the United Nations Mission in Liberia (UNMIL).

Russian ambassador Andrey Denisov said the resolution would send a "strong signal" to Charles Taylor that he was to be arrested and stand trial.

Resolution

Observations
The council began by expressing appreciation to Nigeria and its president, Olusegun Obasanjo, for efforts to restore peace and stability in Liberia and West Africa. It acknowledged that the country had acted with international backing when it gave refuge to Charles Taylor temporarily. At the same time, the council determined that Taylor's return to Liberia would threaten the stability of the country and that he remained under the indictment of the special court. Nigeria had refused to hand over Charles Taylor as it would contravene the terms of the deal under which he stepped down.

Acts
The resolution, enacted under Chapter VII of the United Nations Charter, allowed for UNMIL to apprehend and detain Charles Taylor in the event he returned to Liberia, and to facilitate his transfer to the special court for Sierra Leone.

See also
 Liberian general election, 2005
 List of United Nations Security Council Resolutions 1601 to 1700 (2005–2006)
 Sierra Leone Civil War
 United Nations Integrated Office in Sierra Leone

References

External links
 
Text of the Resolution at undocs.org

 1638
2005 in Liberia
 1638
2005 in Sierra Leone
 1638
Sierra Leone Civil War
November 2005 events